Revolutionary Socialist Party of India (Marxist–Leninist) is a political party of Marxist-leninist orientation in India. Revolutionary Socialist Party of India(M-L) is a break-away party in 1969 from Revolutionary Socialist Party of India. R.S.P.I(M.-L.) was formed in 19 march, 1940. The party seems to have been mainly based in INDIA.

The party contested the 1971 general election, with two candidates in Uttar Pradesh and one in Bihar.

RSPI(ML) ran three candidates in the 2005 Jharkhand state legislative assembly election.

Political parties established in 1940
Communist parties in India